Robert Michael Sweiger (September 20, 1919 – November 1, 1975) was an American football back who played four seasons in the All-America Football Conference (AAFC) with the New York Yankees and Chicago Hornets. He was drafted by the New York Giants of the National Football League (NFL) in the third round of the 1942 NFL Draft. He played college football at the University of Minnesota and attended Central High School in Minneapolis, Minnesota.

College career
Sweiger played fullback for the Minnesota Golden Gophers from 1939 to 1941. He won the Bronko Nagurski Award, given to the team's most valuable player, in 1941.

Professional career
Sweiger was selected by the New York Giants of the NFL with the 23rd pick in the 1942 NFL Draft. He did not play for the Giants and instead enlisted in the United States Navy to serve in World War II. He played football for the Great Lakes Navy Bluejackets of the Great Lakes Naval Training Station while in the Navy. Sweiger also played and coached football at the Farragut Naval Training Station.

He played in 41 games, starting 30, for the New York Yankees of the AAFC from 1946 to 1948. He played in twelve games, all starts, for the AAFC's Chicago Hornets during the 1949 season.

References

External links
Just Sports Stats
College stats

1919 births
1975 deaths
American football defensive backs
American football fullbacks
Chicago Hornets players
Great Lakes Navy Bluejackets football players
Minnesota Golden Gophers football players
New York Yankees (AAFC) players
United States Navy personnel of World War II
Players of American football from Minneapolis